Hanna Vandenbussche (born 3 July 1987) is a Belgian athlete. She competed in the women's marathon event at the 2019 World Athletics Championships.

References

External links

1987 births
Living people
Belgian female long-distance runners
Belgian female marathon runners
Place of birth missing (living people)
World Athletics Championships athletes for Belgium